The Party is a 2017 British black comedy film written and directed by Sally Potter. The film was shot in black and white and features a seven-actor ensemble of Patricia Clarkson, Bruno Ganz, Cherry Jones, Emily Mortimer, Cillian Murphy, Kristin Scott Thomas and Timothy Spall.

It was selected to compete for the Golden Bear in the main competition section of the 67th Berlin International Film Festival and was awarded the Guild Film Prize. The film received positive reviews from critics.

Plot
Janet, a politician for the opposition party, has just been announced as shadow minister for health and is having a small celebratory party at her house. Invited are her friends April; April's estranged German partner Gottfried, a life coach and self-proclaimed spiritual healer; women's studies professor Martha; her partner Jinny, a renowned chef; and Janet's colleague and subordinate Marianne with husband Tom, a handsome younger banker.

Before the party begins and after the guests arrive, Janet's husband Bill slumps in his chair listening to jazz, staring vacantly, and drinking several glasses of wine. All invited guests arrive with the exception of Marianne, who Tom says vaguely will arrive later. Tom is visibly agitated and immediately locks himself in the bathroom, where he cuts and snorts cocaine, examines a handgun he has brought with him and nervously eggs himself on in the bathroom mirror.

Janet has so far discreetly exchanged several snatched phone calls and text messages with an unknown lover.

April, who continually mocks and belittles Gottfried, proposes a toast to Janet on her Ministerial appointment. Trumping the celebration, Martha and Jinny announce that Jinny is pregnant with triplets via in vitro fertilisation. This is in turn followed by Bill announcing that he has just been informed by his doctor he is terminally ill with advanced cancer. Gottfried tells him that Western medicine is not to be believed and that by exploring his spiritual capacities, Bill may have a chance of an extended life. Bill, a well-known atheist intellectual with no belief in a deity, listens to Gottfried's talk of spirituality, apparently with an open-mind.

Janet announces she must resign from her Shadow Minister position to give end of life care to Bill, but Bill responds by announcing that he is leaving her to spend his final days with Marianne, a fact that Tom had learned earlier that day. After berating Bill, Tom runs into the backyard where, agitated, he throws his gun into the dustbin.

While Jinny and Martha are talking about their future as parents, Martha patronizes Jinny, who is deeply hurt and tells Martha that she will leave her. Martha then confesses to Jinny that she fears what will happen to their relationship once the three babies are born, and pleads with Jinny to stay with her.

Events have caused Janet to forget the canapes which have been burnt to ash in the oven. Janet throws the smoking vol-au-vents into the dustbin, finding the gun Tom had thrown there and takes it with her back into the house, locking herself in the bathroom and hiding the gun there. She lets April into the bathroom and they talk about what happened. She asks April, who has been cynical the whole time, to speak honestly with her. April tells her that she is proud of her accomplishments.

Gottfried deploys counselling techniques to Tom and Bill in their distress, but emotions escalate out of control when Bill, by now very drunk, rambles about the love that Marianne and he share. Tom punches him in the face, knocking him out. Gottfried and Tom fear Tom has killed Bill and they try to resuscitate him, eventually seeking help from the others. They retrieve Janet from the locked bathroom, just as she was about to tell April an important secret. Janet manages to resuscitate Bill, who looks her in the eyes and asks, "How did it come to this?" At that moment, the doorbell rings, everyone including the audience assuming it to be Marianne, arriving at last. Janet rushes to the bathroom, grabs the gun, runs to open the door, aims the gun at the unseen visitor on the doorstep and exclaims "You told me you loved me. ME! You traitor!" Action cuts to black.

Cast
 Patricia Clarkson as April, Janet's best friend, a cynic and realist
 Bruno Ganz as Gottfried, April's estranged boyfriend, a pseudo-scientific healer
 Cherry Jones as Martha, Janet's friend, a women's studies professor
 Emily Mortimer as Jinny, Martha's pregnant partner, a famous chef
 Cillian Murphy as Tom, "in finance", the husband of Marianne, Janet's subordinate
 Kristin Scott Thomas as Janet, an idealistic politician
 Timothy Spall as Bill, Janet's husband, a materialist and atheist professor

Release
In February 2017, The Party competed at Berlin International Film Festival.

In May 2017, Picturehouse Entertainment and Roadside Attractions acquired UK and U.S. distribution rights to the film respectively. The film was released in the UK on 13 October 2017. In the US, the film was given a limited release on February 16, 2018.

Critical reception
The Party received positive reviews from film critics. It holds a critical approval rating of 81% on review aggregator website Rotten Tomatoes, based on 150 reviews, with an average rating of 6.96/10. The website's critical consensus reads, "Old-fashioned charm meets sharp wit and modern social satire in The Party, a biting comedy carried by a shining performance from Patricia Clarkson." On Metacritic, the film holds a rating of 73 out of 100, based on 31 critics, indicating "generally favorable reviews". Peter Bradshaw of The Guardian described the film as 'observant and smart' in his review.

Awards and nominations
The Party was awarded the Guild Film Prize at the 2017 Berlin International Film Festival.

References

External links
 Official website
 

2017 films
2017 comedy-drama films
British black-and-white films
British black comedy films
British comedy-drama films
British LGBT-related films
British satirical films
Films directed by Sally Potter
Films about parties
Films set in London
Roadside Attractions films
2010s satirical films
2010s English-language films
2010s British films